The Hampstead Junction Railway was a railway line in north-west London, England, opened in 1860. It connected the existing North London Railway at Camden with the North and South Western Junction Railway. It ran through open country but encouraged residential building, providing passenger train connections with the City of London, as well as connecting other lines. It was absorbed by the North London Railway in 1867. Its route remains in use today with the passenger trains of the North London Line as well as heavy freight traffic.

Origins
The Hampstead Junction Railway was incorporated by Act of Parliament on 20 August 1853 to build a line from Willesden, on the London and North Western Railway (LNWR), to the North London Railway (NLR) at Camden, with a branch to the North and South Western Junction Railway (N&SWJR) at Old Oak Junction.

It "was intended principally to enable local passenger traffic on the North London railway to extend west to Kew and Richmond without the need to pass through Camden station and Primrose Hill Tunnel, where enormous traffic on the London and North Western's main line presented a serious obstacle to the running of local passenger trains at frequent intervals".

The North London Railway ran from Poplar, in east London, westward across north London through Canonbury and Camden, to join the London and North Western Railway at Willesden. (There was no station there until later.) As well as connecting with the London docks, the NLR had a connection to Fenchurch Street station in the City of London.

To the west, the North and South Western Junction Railway had opened, diverging southwards from the LNWR main line at Willesden to Kew, where it connected with the London and South Western Railway (LSWR). This gave it access (over the LSWR) to the important town of Richmond.

Residential travel to places of business in the City of London was increasing considerably, and goods and mineral traffic from the docks and manufacturing areas in East London to the western suburbs was also growing. The Hampstead Junction line provided relief to the LNWR main line, connecting the North London Railway and the N&SWJR.

Opening
The line was opened on 2 January 1860, and was worked by the North London Railway.

From 1864 it was managed by the North London Railway, and absorbed by the LNWR in 1867.

Route description
The Hampstead Junction Railway left the North London Railway to Willesden, diverging northwards at Camden Road Junction. (The adjacent station on the NLR was called Camden Town from 1870 to 1950). At the point of crossing Prince of Wales Road, a station was opened on 1 April 1867, called Kentish Town. It became Kentish Town West on 2 June 1924. The line then turned west at the original Kentish Town (later renamed Gospel Oak, on 1 February 1867) through Hampstead Heath station, followed by Hampstead Tunnel, 1166 yards long. The next station was Finchley Road St Johns Wood, later renamed Finchley Road & Frognal from 2 October 1880. Turning south-west, the line crosses the Midland Railway main line, and there is a station originally called West End Lane, and renamed West Hampstead on 6 May 1975.

Next came Edgware Road station, successively renamed Edgware Road and Brondesbury (1 January 1872), Brondesbury (Edgware Road) (1 January 1873 until 1 May 1873), and then Brondesbury. Brondesbury Park was next, opened on 1 June 1908, followed by  Kensal Green & Harlesden station. From 1 April 1873 there was a station called Kensal Green at Chamberlayne Wood, then a remote dead end road; it was renamed Kensal Rise on 24 May 1890. The 1873 opening replaced an earlier station half a mile or so to the west, at Green Lane (later Wrottesley Road). Opened on 1 November 1861, this station had staggered platforms, so that stopping trains passed under Green Lane (later Wrottesley Road) before the platform was reached; it closed when the new station opened. Immediately west of the old station, there was later a three-way  diverging junction, with the two outer routes leading to the LNWR main line. The centre route leads to a bridge crossing the LNWR main line as the HJR line turns south, joining the N&SWJR at Old Oak Junction. Originally the crossing of the main line was a little to the west of the present route.

Gradients on the line rise from each end to a high point in Hampstead Tunnel, the westbound gradient being steep at 1 in 98.

The North London was electrified at 600 V DC using the four rail system on 1 October 1916; the trains ran from Broad Street to Richmond and also Kew Bridge. The four rail electrification was altered to a three-rail system in August 1970.

In 1996 the line was closed for major upgrade work in connection with the operation of international (Eurostar) trains; this involved substantial alterations and strengthening of the Hampstead Tunnel. The line was reopened on 29 September 1996, and the electrification system was changed to 25 kV AC overhead as part of the work.

References

History of rail transport in London
Railway companies established in 1853
Railway companies disestablished in 1867
British companies established in 1853
British companies disestablished in 1867